Metabronema is a genus of nematodes belonging to the family Cystidicolidae.

Species:

Metabronema canadense
Metabronema insulanum 
Metabronema magna 
Metabronema notopteri 
Metabronema polymixia 
Metabronema salvelini

References

Nematodes